The Scientific Monthly was a science magazine published from 1915 to 1957. Psychologist James McKeen Cattell, the former publisher and editor of The Popular Science Monthly, was the original founder and editor. In 1958, The Scientific Monthly was absorbed by Science.

References

External links
 Archived The Scientific Monthly on the Internet Archive
 Hathi Trust records - https://catalog.hathitrust.org/Record/000519252

American Association for the Advancement of Science academic journals
Monthly magazines published in the United States
Science and technology magazines published in the United States
Defunct magazines published in the United States
Magazines established in 1915
Magazines disestablished in 1957
Magazines published in New York City